Hélène Robert (1910–1981) was a French film actress.

Selected filmography
 Le Roi des resquilleurs (1930)
 Departure (1931)
 Orange Blossom (1932)
 His Best Client (1932)
 The Barber of Seville (1933)
 I Like All the Women (1935)
 The Hunter of Fall (1936)
 The King (1936)
 The Courier of Lyon (1937)
 The West (1938)
 Fric-Frac (1939)
 Kissing Is No Sin (1950)

References

Bibliography
 Goble, Alan. The Complete Index to Literary Sources in Film. Walter de Gruyter, 1999.

External links

1910 births
1981 deaths
French film actresses
Actors from Tours, France
20th-century French women